Jaco Erasmus (born 31 July 1979) is a South African-born Italian rugby union naturalized player. He plays as a flanker.

He played for Rugby Viadana where he gained qualification for the Italian national team. In March 2008 he received a call up to the national team by fellow South African Nick Mallett. He currently plays for Rugby Calvisano

He has currently 3 caps for Italy, all in 2008, 2 of them coming in the 2008 Six Nations Championship.

References

External links
Jaco Erasmus International Statistics

1979 births
Living people
Male rugby sevens players
South African rugby union players
Italian rugby union players
South African emigrants to Italy
Italy international rugby union players
Rugby Calvisano players
Rugby Viadana players
Rugby union flankers
Italian sportspeople of African descent